HMS Unbroken (P42) was a Royal Navy U-class submarine built by Vickers-Armstrong at Barrow-in-Furness; it was part of the third group of that class and has been the only vessel of the Royal Navy to bear the name. She entered service as P42 and was renamed Unbroken on 1 February 1943.

Career

Unbroken was commissioned on 29 January 1942 as P42.
After work up trials in Holy Loch, Unbroken went out to join the 10th Flotilla at Malta, with a work-up patrol from Gibraltar.  She would spend most of her wartime career in the Mediterranean.  She landed saboteurs under the command of Captain Peter Churchill at Antibes in the south of France.  She then proceeded to Malta to reform the 10th Flotilla in June 1942.  She was the only submarine operating from Malta until ,  and  joined. She took part in Operations Harpoon and Vigorous, in June 1942. In July 1942, Unbroken attacked the main west coast railway line on the Italian mainland, and succeeded in blocking the line for 24 hours. However, she received return fire from coastal artillery and sustained a hit on the battery, forcing her to return to Malta. She was badly damaged in October 1942, by a counter-attack by Italian escorts after hitting a tanker, and was again repaired at Malta.

During her time in the Mediterranean, she sank the Italian merchants Edda and Bologna (the former French Monaco), the Italian pilot vessel F 20 / Enrica, and the Italian auxiliary minesweeper No. 17/Milano.  She also damaged the Italian sailing vessel Vale Formoso II, the German (former Norwegian) tanker Regina, and most significantly, the Italian heavy cruiser Bolzano and the Italian light cruiser Muzio Attendolo during Operation Pedestal.  Bolzano was hit in her oil tanks and set ablaze; she had to be beached at Panarea island; the Attendolo lost sixty feet of bow.  Bolzano was out of action for the rest of the war.

Unbroken also attacked the Italian merchant Algerino, but missed her with her torpedoes. She later damaged the Italian merchant Titania, north-west of Tripoli, Libya. Unbroken returned to the UK in December 1943.

In Soviet service
Unbroken was transferred on loan to the Soviet Union on 26 June 1944, where she was renamed V-2 (Cyrillic: В-2). Sailing under Soviet flag she sank the German submarine chaser UJ-1220 on 12 October 1944. She spent four years in Soviet service before being returned to the Royal Navy in 1949.  She was scrapped at Gateshead from 9 May 1950.

References

Bibliography
 
 
 
 Submarines, War Beneath The Waves, From 1776 To The Present Day, by Robert Hutchinson

External links

 Captain Sir Edward Archdale, Bt - Daily Telegraph obituary
 Unbroken: The Story of a Submarine by Alastair Mars, an autobiographical account by her commanding officer.

 

British U-class submarines
Ships built in Barrow-in-Furness
1941 ships
World War II submarines of the United Kingdom
British U-class submarines of the Soviet Navy
World War II submarines of the Soviet Union
Soviet Union–United Kingdom relations